John Allan Conroy (born January 17, 1966) is a Canadian former professional ice hockey centre who played in 114 National Hockey League (NHL) games over parts of three seasons with the Philadelphia Flyers.

Awards
 WHL East First All-Star Team – 1986

External links
 

1966 births
Living people
Adirondack Red Wings players
Canadian expatriate ice hockey players in Italy
Canadian expatriate sportspeople in Germany
Canadian expatriate sportspeople in Japan
Canadian ice hockey centres
Detroit Vipers players
HC Varese players
Hershey Bears players
Houston Aeros (1994–2013) players
Medicine Hat Tigers players
Nippon Paper Cranes players
Philadelphia Flyers players
SC Rapperswil-Jona Lakers players
Rochester Americans players
Spokane Chiefs coaches
Ice hockey people from Calgary
Undrafted National Hockey League players
Canadian ice hockey coaches